San Marcos Academy or SMA (also known as San Marcos Baptist Academy or SMBA) is a private, coeducational, college preparatory Christian school that is affiliated with the Baptist General Convention of Texas. It is accredited by the Southern Association of Colleges and Schools and the Texas Association of Boarding Schools. The academy was founded in 1907; its mission is to educate young men and women within a nurturing community based upon Christian values. The academy accepts boarding students in grades 6–12 and day students in grades K-12. Enrollment in 2009 was 274, with about 75% in the residence program. The school is located in the Texas Hill Country in San Marcos, Texas, United States, south of Austin, and north of San Antonio.

San Marcos Academy is one of the oldest boarding schools in the state of Texas, and was established in 1907 by Texas Baptists with the support of the city of San Marcos. The academy's first president was James Milton Carroll.

The academy has students matriculate at a wide range of colleges and universities.

History

After an organization drive that began in 1905, the Southwest Texas Baptist Conference established the school in 1907 by matching $25,000 raised by citizens of San Marcos. James Milton Carroll, a leader of the founding campaign, served the academy as its first president. The school enrolled an entering class of 200 students on September 24, 1908. Carroll resigned in 1911; the academy's original building, granted a state historical marker in 1970, became known as Carroll Hall. Thomas Green Harris succeeded Carroll, and the Christian Education Program of the Baptist General Convention of Texas began administrative oversight in 1911.

After the United States entered World War I in 1917, the federal government granted the academy a junior unit of the Reserve Officer Training Corps. For a time all male students were require to have served in the corps of cadets, and all those in grades nine through twelve are formally enrolled in the army Junior ROTC program, but it is no longer required. Girls have also participated in military training on an optional basis since 1973 when two students, Mary Shepard and Karen Stubbs led the development of the first female platoon. By 1936 the academy's physical plant had increased to twelve buildings on a fifty-six-acre site valued at $400,000. Students in grades one through twelve studied general academic courses as well as fine arts and business subjects. In 1968 more than 500 students in grades three through twelve attended the academy; in 1986 the enrollment was 240 boys in grades six through twelve and 120 girls in grades nine through twelve. Also in January 1982, under the administration of Jack E. Byrom the academy moved from its location at the current Texas State University campus, to a more spacious lot on Ranch Road 12. The academy has had students from a number of other states and foreign nations. Most Academy students reside in dormitories on campus and attend mandatory chapel services on Wednesdays, and devotionals on Mondays. Chapel services are currently optional for both boarding and day students, taking place at First Baptist Church on Sunday.

Since the school's beginning, the academy has accepted students from all religious faiths. Students of both sexes have competed in athletic events against other private schools.

The academy is a member of the Texas Association of Private and Parochial Schools and is accredited by the Independent Schools Association of the Southwest, the Southern Association of Colleges and Schools, the Texas Education Agency, and the accrediting commission of the Texas Association of Baptist Schools. A fifteen-member board of trustees selected by the Baptist General Convention of Texas continues to govern the academy.

Thirty-five full-time and twelve part-time teachers composed the faculty in 1993; three administrators supervised Academy operations. That year the endowment of the academy exceeded $3 million, and the institution's assets exceeded $15 million. After selling its original site and buildings to Southwest Texas State University (now Texas State) in 1979, the academy moved to its present  site.

Alma mater
Green and Purple of the Laurel, bind us though we part
Keep the spirit ever with you, deep within your heart
Men and women of tomorrow, we’ll be proud of you
The lives you now are building will be strong and true
There’ll be echoes in your memory of cadets out on parade
And of students in the chapel with their heads bowed as they prayed
Fellowship is given those who come from far and near
To these hallow’d halls of learning which we hold so dear
Blessed are the lessons learned, and through the years may we
Be ever true to you, San Marcos Academy

School mascot and colors
The mascot of SMA is the bear: the boys' sports teams are referred to as “Bears” and the girls' teams as “Lady Bears”. The school colors are derived from the mountain laurel and are forest green and purple.

Tuition
Tuition in San Marcos Academy for the 2009–2010 school year is $25,511 for boarding students ($27,511 for international students) and $7,996 for day students grades 9–12 and $7,565 for day students in grades 7 and 8, not including optional and mandatory fees. The academy offers need-based financial aid.

Students that come to the academy after attending Wonderland Elementary School receive a discount on tuition.

August 1, 2013 - Tuition and boarding fees are $45,000 for international students & $9,700 for day students.

See also
Southern Baptist Convention

1907 establishments in Texas
Baptist schools in the United States
Private boarding schools in Texas
Buildings and structures in San Marcos, Texas
Christian schools in Texas
Educational institutions established in 1907
San Marcos Academy
San Marcos Academy
Preparatory schools in Texas
Schools accredited by the Southern Association of Colleges and Schools
Schools in Hays County, Texas